MapleStory is a free-to-play, 2D, side-scrolling massively multiplayer online role-playing game, developed by South Korean company Wizet. Several versions of the game are available for specific countries or regions, published by various companies (such as Nexon).

In the game, players travel the "Maple World", defeating monsters and developing their characters' skills and abilities as is typical in role-playing games. Players can interact with others in many ways, including chatting and trading. Groups of players can band together in parties to hunt monsters and share rewards, and can also form guilds to interact more easily with each other. Players additionally have the option to visit the in-game "Cash Shop" to purchase a variety of character appearances or gameplay enhancements with real money.

In July 2010, the Korean version of the game was completely revised in a patch named the "Big Bang". Other versions followed suit and have since received the Big Bang update. Later in the year, the Korean version received the Chaos update which introduced PvP (player-versus-player) and professions to the game. Its sequel, MapleStory 2, was released in July 2015 and features updated 3D graphics and a similar storyline.

Plot
The plot of MapleStory takes place across several different worlds, such as Maple World and Grandis. Created by these people with powers called the Overseers, they assigned each world with three guardians to look over both worlds: the Transcendent of Time, Transcendent of Life and the Transcendent of Light. The first major arc revolves around the antagonist of Maple World, the Black Mage. The Black Mage was once the Transcendent of Light and was called the White Mage until an experiment went wrong and his pure light core was corrupted. The six heroes managed to seal the Black Mage for the next few centuries at the cost of being sealed away themselves. In the present day, the Black Mage's forces called the Black Wings, began resurfacing and attempted to revive him. Fearing his resurrection, Empress Cygnus created the Cygnus Knights in order to stop the Black Wings and the Black Mage's Commanders. As the seal on the Black Mage began weakening, the heroes of legend began returning as well. After the Black Mage broke free of his seal, Cygnus created the Maple Alliance, which banded together the free-spirited Explorers, the Cygnus Knights, the Resistance against the Black Wings, the six Heroes of Maple, and several brave adventurers from other worlds.     

The Alliance continued fighting the Black Wings and won a decisive victory in the battle of Black Heaven, during which time, a hero of the Alliance awakened as the Adversary, a champion imbued with divine energy. Soon after, the Black Mage created a dimension called the Arcane River in an attempt to destroy the world and recreate it in his image. The Adversary journeyed through the Arcane River and battled the last of the Black Mage's Commanders before the Alliance launched a final offensive to stop the Black Mage from ending their world. The Adversary successfully killed the Black Mage and saved Maple World from annihilation.

With the Black Mage's death, the second major arc began in the realm of Grandis, which had slowly fused with Maple World due to the Black Mage's machinations. The antagonist of Grandis, Gerand Darmoor, believed that his race, the High Flora, were superior to all others, and so he sought to remake all life in his image. In order to stop him, several factions of Grandis had joined the Maple Alliance. After the Black Mage's death, the Alliance sent its forces to battle Darmoor and his Apostles.

Gameplay
MapleStory is a 2D scrolling platform game. The controls for the game are executed using the keyboard and mouse. The keyboard is used for many game functions, and much of it can be rearranged to suit users' needs. The mouse is mainly used to trigger NPCs and manipulate items. Like most MMORPGs, gameplay centers on venturing into dungeons and combating monsters in real-time. The players combat monsters and complete quests, in the process acquiring in-game currency called "Mesos", experience points, and various items. Players are able to acquire in-game professions, allowing them to craft equipment, accessories or potions.

Players have a variety of options when interacting with others online: They can form parties where loot and experience are distributed from a monster; in-game marriages where the game will recognize the two players as a heterosexual couple; guilds which is indicated with a guild's name listed under their character name; or families, an architecture gathering of juniors and seniors. Players are also able to raise or lower the in-game popularity stat entitled Fame of other players and compete with other players in minigames, such as Gomoku or Concentration. They may also engage in trading activities for "Mesos" or other in-game items.

Characters
MapleStory characters exist in worlds or servers. Players are able to create multiple characters in each world, though the characters in different worlds can not interact with each other. Each world is similar in content with each other. The worlds are divided into channels, among which characters are allowed to freely switch. The ability to transfer entire characters between worlds was added in December 2007 to Global MapleStory, with restrictions placed on items. In May 2012, this option was removed as it caused a negative impact on character gameplay.

When creating a new character, there are eight branches of classes currently available to choose from with three classes that have no specific branches currently: Explorers, Cygnus Knights, Heroes, Resistance, Sengoku, Nova, Flora, and Anima. Beast Tamer, Child of God and Kinesis are classes that currently have no specific branches. Some classes are currently not available in other regions while others are only available at certain times of year.

Explorer characters start on Maple Island and begin as a Beginner class. The Beginner is able to advance into one of the five classes: Warrior, Bowmen, Magician, Thief, and Pirate. After choosing their class, further class progression is only allowed within the scope of the first class advancement with advancements at level 30, 60, 100, and 200. Three separate classes, under the adventurer branch, are created differently from normal Adventurers: Dual Blade (Thief), Kinesis (Magician) and Cannoneers (Pirate).

Cygnus Knight characters begin as Noblesse class and begin their journey on Ereve. At level 10, they are allowed to class advance into five Cygnus Knight classes, each one parallels to the Explorer class. Upon reaching the level limit of 120, Cygnus Knights are able to change into a level 50 explorer with benefits.

Six Hero classes are currently available: Aran, Evan, Mercedes, Phantom, Luminous and Shade. The Hero classes are characters with background stories related to the antagonist of the game, the Black Mage. Aran has the Combo System, a unique feature to the class, allowing them to generate combo counts by hitting monsters, giving them buffs and allowing them to cast combo-consuming skills. Evan is similar to Magicians, but uses a dragon, which fights alongside them. Mercedes is an elven archer who uses Dual Bowguns. Phantom is a Thief character with the ability to mimic skills from Adventurer characters. Luminous is a magician of light who can also use dark magic which they absorbed from the Black Mage. Shade is the sixth and forgotten hero, whose existence was erased during the sealing of the Black Mage. They use spirits to aid them in battle.

Resistance characters begin in Edelstein, a town taken over by the Black Mage's followers; the Black Wings. The characters created under the Resistance branch begin as Citizens and have four available job advancements: Battle Mage, Wild Hunter, Blaster and Mechanic. A Battle Mage uses a staff for physical attacks, a Wild Hunter rides a jaguar while wielding a crossbow,  a Blaster uses an arm cannon and a Mechanic uses a robotic suit to fight. Demon, a separate class, under the resistance branch, is created differently from the normal Resistance. A Demon character can become a Demon Slayer, who uses one-handed blunt weapons and axes, or the Demon Avenger, who uses a specialised weapon called the Desperado. Xenon, another separate resistance character, is a human-turned-cyborg who escaped from the Black Wings' laboratories who uses Whip Blades in combat.

World
There are three main continents common to all versions in the MapleStory world: Maple Island, Victoria Island, and Ossyria. Maple Island is where adventurers start off their characters. Victoria Island contains eight cities, and is where most classes begin. Ossyria features seven distinct regions with varying environments: El Nath Mountains, Ludus Lake, Aqua Road, Minar Forest, Mu Lung Garden, Nihal Desert, and Temple of Time. Ereve and Rien are separated from another land which is the beginning of another job of the game.

Cash Shop
The Cash Shop is an in-game shop where players use real-life currency to purchase unique virtual goods such as avatars, digital pets and other in-game items. Most Cash Shop items expire after a period of time. The Cash Shop also offers a shop permit, allowing players to set up a store in the in-game market location called the Free Market.

History
MapleStory was developed and released in South Korea and was localized to ten different regions as of 2010. As other publishers license the game for their region, proxy blocks are put in place (excluding the Korean version, it requires a KSSN), forcing players to play their localized version. On July 7, 2011, LevelUp! Games announced that they will not be renewing the contract for localization in Brazil.

Notable updates
An update entitled Big Bang was released in Korean MapleStory in July 2010 with other regional servers following suit soon after. Big Bang changed the game's core coding, and changed many aspects of the game. An update entitled Chaos features the introduction of professions, and PvP.

On March 4, 2015, Nexon announced a new update for MapleStory's North American server, entitled Black Heaven. Players that registered prior to the update and before March 9 received a free Ignition Pack if they logged in before March 14 and after the update went live. Black Heaven was released on March 11, 2015.

On December 1, 2015, Nexon released the MapleStory Reboot update for its North American server, which allows access to the Reboot world. This world has disabled trading, increased Meso drop rates, and weapon/equipment drops that are specific to the player's class. Reboot has the same monsters as other worlds, but with increased stats and experience points awarded.

On December 14, 2016, Maplestory announced their latest update to the game, the 5th Job Advancement. When players reach Level 200 in the game, they would need to complete their job advancement quests before they are able to fully access their 5th Job skills. Different from the first four Job skills, the 5th Job skills come in three types of skills. The first one called the Shared Skills are skills that all characters share and have that they are able to use. The second one is called the Class-Specific, which are skills that only specific classes can use and the third one called the Job Skills which are skills that only that specific Job can use.

On July 20, 2022, Nexon released the Destiny: Remastered update for its North American server. This update revamped all the Explorer classes (excluding the newest Explorer class, Pathfinder) by updating their skills and adding new storyline content for them while streamlining their original storylines. A new boss, Kalos, was also added to the game.

Players and Revenue
In Global MapleStory (GMS), more than a million players bought items in the Cash Shop, by 2010. In 2006, Nexon announced MapleStory had a combined total of 39 million user accounts worldwide. MapleStory Global had over 8 million users by 2011. As of 2014, it was among the top ten MMOs by worldwide revenue. , the game has reached over  registered users worldwide.

Up until 2011, the game grossed $1.8billion. Between 2013 and 2017, the game grossed $billion, including $326million in 2013, $240million in 2014, $253million in 2015, $83million in 2016, and $279million in 2017. , the game has grossed over  worldwide in lifetime revenue.

Related games

MapleStory DS 
MapleStory DS is a game based on MapleStory and features a single-player experience. The game was released for the Nintendo DS on April 15, 2010 in Korea.

MapleStory M 
MapleStory M is a mobile game released for iOS and Android, in South Korea during October 2016 and then overseas on May 28, 2018.

Sequel
The sequel, MapleStory 2, was released in Korea on July 7, 2015. Unlike its predecessor, MapleStory 2 takes place on a 3D voxel-based plane at an often isometric angle.

Media adaptations
The Japanese anime entitled  was adapted of the game and produced by Madhouse. It was aired on TV Tokyo between October 7, 2007 and March 30, 2008, spanning 25 episodes. The plot revolves around a warrior as he journeys to revive the world tree.

The North American publisher of Nexon released a MapleStory trading card game on November 6, 2007. Nexon Korea and Japan have since released similar trading card games, while Nexon North America has discontinued this service.

Two adaptations of MapleStory have been released for iOS by Nexon Mobile: MapleStory: Thief Edition and MapleStory: Cygnus Knights Edition. The Thief Edition has only one job, Thief, while the other edition features two jobs: a Soul Master and a Fire Wizard. The games do not have multiplayer.

On July 27, 2011, Nexon released a public beta of a MapleStory Adventures as an adaptation for Facebook gaming format. The game consist of mainly single-player, but incorporates the main goals and themes of the full MapleStory game, which includes creating an avatar, fighting monsters and completing quests. This version has been discontinued as of July 31, 2013.

References

External links

 Official MapleStory International website
 MapleStory Global

 
2003 video games
Active massively multiplayer online games
Airships in fiction
Free online games
Free-to-play video games
IOS games
Massively multiplayer online role-playing games
Nexon franchises
Nexon games
Side-scrolling video games
Video games developed in South Korea
Windows games
Windows-only games
Level Up! Games games
Asiasoft games